Mr. Socrates is a 2005 Korean crime film.

Plot
Asking for money to his father imprisoned in jail, threatening a friend who became a murderer by mistake, stealing money from his friends... Ku Dong-hyuk (Kim Rae-won) is the worst scumbag you can ever imagine. Living a low-life like a street dog, one day, Dong-hyuk gets kidnapped by a mysterious gang. Being captured out of no reason, the gang trains Dong-hyuk in a secret and inhumane way repeatedly. Dong-hyuk tries to escape but fails, which makes the training more harsh and cruel than before. After finishing all the training, the gang orders Dong-hyuk to become a police detective as their secret connection.

References

External links 
 
 

2005 films
2000s Korean-language films
South Korean crime action films
2000s crime action films
2000s South Korean films